Women's football in Jamaica was first introduced to the Island in 1935. Later on the sport grew in popularity forming leagues.

The actually known first professional football player of the world was Beverly Ranger. 

Many women face prejudice and stigma for playing the game.

Towards the end of 2010's the Jamaican Football Federation scrapped the women's programme.

In 2011 $33 million was spent on the women's youth development.

History 
The first ever women's football match in Jamaica was on November 29 of 1935. It was a match to raise funds for the Jubilee Memorial Fund. In 1987, the Women’s National Football team was founded, with Andrea Lewis as its first president. Football in Jamaica has always been a pastime ever since the 1890s when men’s football was introduced. Since then football has flourished due to the suitable climate as well as the numerous teams that play.

Cultural 

Culturally, women’s football and football in general, is a very popular sport along with cricket in Jamaica. Numerous clubs, teams and national teams have been created both for men and women to play. On the streets, there will often be people playing football in makeshift arenas or just on the pavement.

National team

The Jamaican national team played their first international match in 1991.

The national women's team qualified for 2019 FIFA Women's World Cup the first time a national women's team had qualified for a World cup. In 2008 the national team was disbanded and only revived due to efforts of  Cedella Marley.

See also
Football in Jamaica

References